Bushnell may refer to:

Places

United States
 Bushnell, Florida, a city
 Bushnell Army Airfield, a World War II airfield
 Bushnell, Georgia, an unincorporated community
 Bushnell, Illinois, a city
 Bushnell Township, McDonough County, Illinois
 Bushnell Township, Michigan
 Bushnell, Missouri, an unincorporated community
 Bushnell, Nebraska, a village
 Bushnell, South Dakota, a town
 Bushnell Park, Hartford, Connecticut
 Bushnell Peak, Colorado
 Bushnell Rock Formation, Oregon

Antarctica
 Mount Bushnell, Ross Dependency

People
Asa S. Bushnell (Governor) (1834–1904), American politician, 40th governor of Ohio and president of the Warder, Bushnell and Glessner Company, which became one of four companies that merged to form International Harvester
Bert Bushnell (1921–2010), British rower, 1948 Olympic gold medalist in double sculls
Candace Bushnell (born 1958), American journalist and author
Colin J. Bushnell (1947–2021), British mathematician 
Cornelius Scranton Bushnell (1829–1896),  American railroad executive and shipbuilder who helped build the USS Monitor for the Union Navy
Daniel Bushnell (1808–1891), American industrialist
David Bushnell (1754–1824), American inventor
David Bushnell (historian) (1923–2010), American academic and Latin American historian
David P. Bushnell (1913–2005), American entrepreneur
Dennis M. Bushnell, NASA scientist
E. A. Bushnell (1872–1939), American newspaper cartoonist
Emily Bushnell (born 1950), Tufts University professor of psychology
Geoffrey Bushnell (1903–1978), British archaeologist
George E. Bushnell (1887–1965), member of the Michigan Supreme Court from 1934 to 1955
Horace Bushnell (1802–1876), American Congregational minister and theologian
John Bushnell (died 1701), English sculptor
Katharine Bushnell (1855–1946), American medical doctor, Christian writer, medical missionary to China, Bible scholar, and social activist
Kenneth Wayne Bushnell (born 1933), American visual artist
Linda Bushnell, American electrical engineer and control theorist
Nehemiah Bushnell (1813–1873), American attorney, businessman and politician
Nolan Bushnell (born 1943), American engineer and entrepreneur who founded Atari, Inc. and the Chuck E. Cheese's Pizza-Time Theaters chain
O. A. Bushnell (1913–2002), American microbiologist, historian, novelist and professor
Prudence Bushnell (born 1946), American diplomat
Robert T. Bushnell (1896–1949), American politician and Massachusetts Attorney General
Thomas Bushnell (born 1967), formerly Michael Bushnell, programmer and GNU contributor
Washington Bushnell (1827–1885), American politician and Illinois Attorney General

Other uses
Bushnell Corporation, American manufacturer of optics and outdoor gear
Bushnell Center for the Performing Arts, a theater venue in Hartford, Connecticut
Bushnell University, a private Christian university in Eugene, Oregon
, a survey ship that was originally commissioned as the USS Bushnell (AS-2) submarine tender in honor of David Bushnell
, a submarine tender commissioned in 1943

See also
Helen Gilbert (1922–2012), American artist also known as Helen Gilbert-Bushnell